Horse riding or horseback riding refers to:

Equestrianism
Horse Riding (EP), an EP by The Hiatus

See also
Equestrian (disambiguation)